Fable is an upcoming action role-playing game developed by Playground Games and published by Xbox Game Studios. The game serves as a reboot for the Fable series and will be released for Microsoft Windows and Xbox Series X/S.

Development 
Fable will be the first new instalment in the series since Fable: The Journey was released on Xbox 360 in 2012, having gone on hiatus with the cancellation of Fable Legends and the subsequent closure of the original developers Lionhead Studios. The first mention of a new instalment in the series came in 2017, when Head of Xbox Phil Spencer said on Twitter that the franchise had "a lot of places it could go".

In early 2018, Eurogamer reported that a fourth Fable game had started development by Playground Games, known for their work on the Forza Horizon series. Later that year, it was reported that Playground Games was hiring 177 positions for an open world role-playing game.

Forbes reported on a video was leaked ahead of E3 2019 and it pertained to Fable by Playground Games.

In July 2020, the game was formally announced at the Xbox Games Showcase and described as a "new beginning" for the series.
In December 2020, Anne Megill, former dev from Rememdy Entertainment, was hired as a lead writer.

In January 2022, Megill revealed the studio was looking for someone who had “a creative eye for storytelling mechanics & systems & a deep understanding of the interactive requirements of game narrative “. This was suggesting the game is far from completion. 

In July, Megill was promoted to narrative lead. In October 2022, Andrew Walsh, senior writer for Horizon Forbidden West, joined the Fable team. In November, 2022, Xbox boss said the game will include “high quality, crafting, and attention to detail to its Fable pitch “

References

External links
Official website

Upcoming video games
Action role-playing video games
Single-player video games
Fable (video game series)
Microsoft games
Video game reboots
Video games developed in the United Kingdom
Video games featuring protagonists of selectable gender
Windows games
Xbox Series X and Series S games